Michel Larocque (born October 3, 1976) is a German former professional ice hockey goaltender who played three games in the National Hockey League (NHL) with the Chicago Blackhawks.

Awards and honours

References

External links

1976 births
Boston University Terriers men's ice hockey players
German ice hockey goaltenders
Chicago Blackhawks players
Cleveland Lumberjacks players
Greensboro Generals players
Living people
Norfolk Admirals players
Saint John Flames players
San Jose Sharks draft picks
Wilkes-Barre/Scranton Penguins players
German ice hockey players
AHCA Division I men's ice hockey All-Americans
People from Lahr
Sportspeople from Freiburg (region)